Mistakodden ("the mistake point") is a headland at Barentsøya, Svalbard. It is the westernmost point of Barentsøya.

References

Headlands of Svalbard
Barentsøya